Gollapalli Reservoir is an irrigation project located in Anantapur district of Andhra Pradesh, India. It receives water from Handri-Neeva canal which draws water from Srisailam reservoir. It is located at Gollapalli village in Penukonda Constituency.

Details 
The project was started as a part of Jalayagnam. It was inaugurated on 2 December 2016 by then Chief minister of Andhra Pradesh N. Chandrababu Naidu. The storage capacity of the reservoir is 1.91 tmcft. Water is further pumped from this reservoir to Madakasira and Hindupur through HNSS Main canal.

References 

Reservoirs in Andhra Pradesh
Dams in Andhra Pradesh
Geography of Anantapur district
2016 establishments in Andhra Pradesh
Dams completed in 2016